Daniel Denis Étienne  (born 20 October 1948) is a retired French cyclist who won a gold medal in the 4000 m individual pursuit at the 1968 Summer Olympics; he finished fifth in the team pursuit event. In 1969 he won individual and team bronze medals in the same events at the amateur world championships. The same year he turned professional, and in 1973 won the national title in the individual pursuit. He rode the 1974 Tour de France, and finished 77th overall.

Major results
1968
 1st  Individual pursuit, Olympic Games

References

External links

1948 births
Living people
People from Tournan-en-Brie
French male cyclists
Olympic gold medalists for France
Cyclists at the 1968 Summer Olympics
Olympic cyclists of France
French track cyclists
Olympic medalists in cycling
Medalists at the 1968 Summer Olympics
Sportspeople from Seine-et-Marne
Cyclists from Île-de-France